Sapna Valley is a large valley in the Kurdistan Region of Iraq, contained by two small mountain ranges to the north which are part of the greater Zagros mountain range. The valley is watered by the Great Zab river which flows along the eastern portion of the valley, and features hilly terrain in the central portion of it around Amadiya District.

See also 

 Araden
 Bamarni
 Dehi

Sources 

Geography of Iraqi Kurdistan
Assyrian geography